Hope Sandoval (born June 24, 1966) is an American singer-songwriter who is the lead singer of Mazzy Star and Hope Sandoval & the Warm Inventions. Sandoval has toured and collaborated with other artists, including Massive Attack, for whom she sang "Paradise Circus" on the 2010 album Heligoland and the 2016 single "The Spoils".

Early life
Sandoval was born June 24, 1966 in Los Angeles, California to Mexican-American parents and raised in east Los Angeles. Her father was a butcher, while her mother worked for a potato chip manufacturing company. She has one sibling and seven half-siblings. Sandoval's parents separated when she was a child and she was raised primarily by her mother.

She attended Mark Keppel High School in Alhambra, but struggled socially and academically, and was placed in special education classes. She began to forgo her classes, instead staying home and listening to records. "It's just like anybody elsesome people, most people don't wanna go to school. They just don't want to", Sandoval recalled. "I was just somebody who got away with it… There wasn't really anyone watching". She eventually dropped out of high school.

Sandoval took an interest in music at an early age, and, at age 13, was particularly influenced by the Rolling Stones. In 1986, she formed the folk music duo Going Home with Sylvia Gomez and sent a demo tape to David Roback. He contacted the duo and suggested that he would "play guitar for you guys". The material recorded by Gomez, Sandoval and Roback has yet to be released.

Career

Opal and Mazzy Star (1988–1996)
Sandoval performed with the band Opal in the late 1980s alongside David Roback and long-time Roback collaborator Kendra Smith. After Smith's abrupt departure during a tour of the UK (hurling her guitar to the floor at the Hammersmith gig), Sandoval took over lead vocals. At the end of the tour, Roback and Sandoval began writing together and formed the alternative rock band Mazzy Star.

The first Mazzy Star album, She Hangs Brightly, was released in 1990. While not a commercial success, this album did establish Mazzy Star as a band with a unique sound.

The band had a surprise breakthrough hit single released in October 1993. "Fade into You"from the band's second album So Tonight That I Might Seewas recorded one year before it became a success.

There is a continuity between the sounds and moods established on Mazzy Star's first two albums and the band's third, Among My Swan. Mazzy Star went on hiatus in 1997.

Hope Sandoval and the Warm Inventions (2000–2010)
Sandoval formed The Warm Inventions in 2000 and released her first solo album Bavarian Fruit Bread in 2001, which she recorded with My Bloody Valentine drummer Colm Ó Cíosóig. The album differed in terms of theme, voice, and instrumentation from that of her work with Mazzy Star. Bert Jansch plays guitar on two tracks, and the album features two covers, "Butterfly Mornings" from the film The Ballad of Cable Hogue (1970) and Jesus and Mary Chain's "Drop". The Warm Inventions released two EPs, At the Doorway Again in 2000 and Suzanne in 2002 but did not win commercial success, with one video on MTV and little radio play. Sandoval recorded a song, "Wild Roses", for a compilation CD released by Air France, In the Air (2008).

Hope Sandoval and The Warm Inventions released their second album, Through the Devil Softly, on September 29, 2009.

Sandoval and her band were chosen by Matt Groening to perform at the edition of the All Tomorrow's Parties festival he curated in May 2010 in Minehead, England. The group also played the ATP New York 2010 music festival in Monticello, New York in September 2010 at the request of film director Jim Jarmusch.

Mazzy Star re-formation (2011–2014)
In 2009, Sandoval confirmed in an interview with Rolling Stone that Mazzy Star was still active: "It's true we're still together. We're almost finished [with the record]. But I have no idea what that means." In October 2011, the group released the single "Common Burn"/"Lay Myself Down", their first material in 15 years. The group stated that they had plans to release the album in 2012. In July 2013, "California", the first single from the new album was released. The album, Seasons of Your Day, was released in September 2013.

David Roback died in Los Angeles on February 24, 2020 from metastatic cancer.

Renewed solo activity (2016–present)
On March 9, 2016, it was confirmed that Hope Sandoval & The Warm Inventions would release a 7" vinyl single titled "Isn't It True" for Record Store Day 2016. The track also features Jim Putnam of Radar Bros. A music video for the song was released on April 19, and is dedicated to Richie Lee of Acetone. The Warm Inventions' third studio album, Until the Hunter, was released on November 4 through the band's own independent record label, Tendril Tales. A second single from the album, "Let Me Get There" featuring Kurt Vile, was released on September 23.

Sandoval contributed vocals to "I Don't Mind" by Psychic Ills, which was released on March 29, 2016. Four months later, Massive Attack released "The Spoils", which was her third collaboration with the band, following "Paradise Circus" and "Four Walls". A music video starring actress Cate Blanchett was released on August 9.

She covered "Big Boss Man" on Mercury Rev's 2019 album Bobbie Gentry's The Delta Sweete Revisited.

Performing style
During live performances, Sandoval prefers to sing in near-darkness with only a dim backlight, playing the tambourine, harmonica, glockenspiel or shaker. She has a reputation for shyness. Her stage presence has been described as "idly withdrawn, barely acknowledging the audience".

Personal life
Sandoval lives in Berkeley, California.

Discography

Mazzy Star

 She Hangs Brightly (1990)
 So Tonight That I Might See (1993)
 Among My Swan (1996)
 Seasons of Your Day (2013)

Hope Sandoval and the Warm Inventions

 Bavarian Fruit Bread (2001)
 Through the Devil Softly (2009)
 Until the Hunter (2016)

Collaborations
Sandoval has collaborated with numerous other artists.
 "Sometimes Always" by The Jesus and Mary Chain, from Stoned & Dethroned (1994)
 "Perfume" by The Jesus and Mary Chain, from Munki (1998)
 "Asleep from Day" by The Chemical Brothers, from Surrender (1999)
 "Killing Smile" and "Help Yourself" by Death in Vegas, from Scorpio Rising (2002)
 "All This Remains" by Bert Jansch, from Edge of a Dream (2002)
 "Cherry Blossom Girl (Hope Sandoval Version)" by Air, from "Cherry Blossom Girl" (2004)
 "Angels' Share" by Vetiver, from Vetiver (2004)
 "Harmony" and "Papillon de Nuit" by Le Volume Courbe, from I Killed My Best Friend (2005) 
 "Paradise Circus" by Massive Attack, from Heligoland (2010)
 "Four Walls" by Massive Attack vs. Burial, non-album single (2011)
 "Not At All" by Dirt Blue Gene, from Watergrasshill (2013)
 "I Don't Mind" by Psychic Ills, from Inner Journey Out (2016)
 "The Spoils" by Massive Attack, non-album single (2016)
 "Big Boss Man" by Mercury Rev, from Bobbie Gentry's The Delta Sweete Revisited (2019)
 "I'll Walk With You" by Elizabeth Hart, from Songs for Tres (2021)

References

Notes

Citations

External links

 
 
 
 

1966 births
American women singer-songwriters
Singer-songwriters from California
Dream pop musicians
American women rock singers
Living people
American musicians of Mexican descent
American writers of Mexican descent
Singers from Los Angeles
Rough Trade Records artists
American contraltos
20th-century American women singers
21st-century American women singers
Mazzy Star members
Hispanic and Latino American musicians
20th-century American singers
21st-century American singers
Hispanic and Latino American women singers